Bhosari (IAST: Bhosarī), historically known as Bhojapur, is a suburb in the city of Pune, India. It is well known for its cultural and sports activities like Wrestling & Kabaddi

History
Bhosari has a salubrious climate all year round. Excavated by archaeologists, the 2000-year-old 'Artist temple' and the "Artist Mahal" is one of the monuments of interest in the township. King Bhoj is known to have organized many cultural events here. The artists performing at the "Artist Mahal" had their residence three kilometers away from the capital city. During excavation of the city, archaeologists discovered many artifacts, like pots and other equipments, which date back to 200 A.D. Currently Bhosari is known for most crowded place in Pimpri-Chinchwad and especially for Wrestling. Many sport centers for wrestling are contributing in building national and international champions.

Bhosari village has a history dating to Gautam Buddha's era.

Location
The NH60 (Pune - Nashik National Highway) goes through Bhosari.

Bhosari Maharashtra Industrial Development Corporation is the largest industrial area in this region containing big companies like Tata Motors, Philips, Thermax, Century Enka etc.

References

Cities and towns in Pune district
Neighbourhoods in Pimpri-Chinchwad